The Dagestan Autonomous Soviet Socialist Republic (1921–1991), abbreviated as Dagestan ASSR or DASSR and also unofficially known as Soviet Dagestan or just simply Dagestan, was an autonomous republic of the Russian SFSR within the Soviet Union. This "Land of Mountains" was known also for having a "mountain of peoples," with more than thirty ethnic groups indigenous to the territory. Although as part of its strategy to promote local languages and to discourage pan-Turkic and pan-Islamic movements, a half-dozen of these ethnicities were provided with schooling in their native language at some point in Soviet history, Russian language became the most widespread second language and gradually the lingua franca, especially in urban areas.

The minor planet 2297 Daghestan, discovered in 1978 by Soviet astronomer Nikolai Chernykh, is named after the Dagestan ASSR.

Gallery

See also
Republic of Dagestan
List of leaders the Dagestan ASSR
First Secretary of the Dagestan Communist Party
Flag of the Dagestan Autonomous Soviet Socialist Republic

Notes

References

Autonomous republics of the Russian Soviet Federative Socialist Republic
States and territories established in 1921
Former socialist republics
1921 establishments in Russia
1991 disestablishments in the Soviet Union